Robert Sanderson (19 September 158729 January 1663) was an English theologian and casuist.

Family and education
He was born in Sheffield in Yorkshire and grew up at Gilthwaite Hall, near Rotherham. He was educated at Lincoln College, Oxford. Entering the Church, he rose to be Bishop of Lincoln.

Logician
His work on logic, Logicae Artis Compendium (1615), was long a standard treatise on the subject. It enjoyed at least ten editions during the seventeenth century and was widely read as a textbook. Sanderson's biographer, Izaak Walton writes that by 1678 'Logicae' had sold 10,000 copies. In her introduction to the 1985 facsimile edition E. J. Ashworth writes that "The young Isaac Newton studied Sanderson's logic at Cambridge, and as late as 1704." Thomas Heywood of St. John's College, Ashworth adds, recommended Newton "Sanderson or Aristotle himself". Sanderson's logic remained popular even after the appearance of the influential Port-Royal Logic.

Church career
Sanderson's sermons were also admired; but he is perhaps best remembered for his Nine Cases of Conscience Resolved (1678), in consideration of which he has been placed at the head of English casuists. He left large collections of historical and heraldic matter in MS.

At the Stuart Restoration, he was elected to the See of Lincoln on 13 October 1660, confirmed 24 October and consecrated a bishop on 28 October.

Sanderson is today perhaps best known as the subject of one of Izaak Walton's Lives, published in 1678.

Works
 The Works of Robert Sanderson in Six Volumes (1854) edited by William Jacobson. Oxford at the University Press. Most volumes are available in full or partial views in Google Books.
 Logicae Artis Compendium, edited by E. J. Ashworth. Bologna: Editrice CLUEB, 1985. Also published as vol.VI in 'The Works of Robert Sanderson in Six Volumes' W. Jacobson (ed).

References

External links

Short biography at Rotherham.co.uk

 Archival Material at 

|-

1587 births
1663 deaths
Bishops of Lincoln
Westminster Divines
English sermon writers
Fellows of Lincoln College, Oxford
People from Rotherham
17th-century Church of England bishops
Alumni of Lincoln College, Oxford
Regius Professors of Divinity (University of Oxford)
16th-century Anglican theologians
17th-century Anglican theologians